Zoramia gilberti is a Cardinalfish from the Western Central Pacific. It occasionally makes its way into the aquarium trade. It grows to a size of 4.2 cm in length. It is found in sheltered bays and lagoons, where it gathers in large aggregations among branching corals, frequently mixed with other cardinalfish species. The specific name honours the American ichthyologist and fisheries biologist Charles H. Gilbert (1859-1928) of Stanford University who was a colleague of Jordan's.

References

gilberti
Fish described in 1905
Taxa named by David Starr Jordan